Magnus Barthelsson is a guitarist and former member of Therion (1993–1994), Grain, Feeble Lies, Conspiracy and Formicide.

References

External links
 

Therion (band) members
Swedish heavy metal guitarists
Living people
Year of birth missing (living people)
Place of birth missing (living people)